Casa de Oro (Spanish for "House of Gold") is a neighborhood in east San Diego County, California, United States. The community, twelve miles east of San Diego, is in the unincorporated town of Spring Valley and an unincorporated part of La Mesa. The United States Census Bureau has also divided the neighborhood between two census-designated places (CDPs), Spring Valley CDP and Casa de Oro-Mount Helix CDP. Casa de Oro's main thoroughfare is Campo Road.

The USGS places Casa de Oro at  (32.7489409 -116.9808600). Mail sent to Casa de Oro is addressed to Spring Valley, CA or La Mesa, CA, depending on the exact location.

References

Unincorporated communities in San Diego County, California
La Mesa, California
Unincorporated communities in California